Khadra'  is a village in the District of Jabal al Akhdar in north-eastern Libya. It is located 35 km south of Bayda.

References

External links
Satellite map at Maplandia.com

Populated places in Jabal al Akhdar